The Boston Weekly Post-Boy (1734–1754) and later Boston Post-Boy was a newspaper published by postmaster  Ellis Huske in 18th-century Boston, Massachusetts. The paper appeared weekly, on Mondays.

Although the paper ceased in 1754, it was more or less later "revived Aug. 22, 1757, by new publishers, under the title Boston Weekly Advertiser."

References

Further reading

 Mary Farwell Ayer and Albert Matthews. Check-list of Boston newspapers 1704-1780. Publications of the Colonial Society of Massachusetts, Volume 9. Boston: 1907.
 Charles E. Clark. The public prints: the newspaper in Anglo-American culture, 1665-1740. Oxford University Press US, 1994.

Publications established in 1734
1754 disestablishments in the Thirteen Colonies
Defunct newspapers published in Massachusetts
18th century in Boston
Newspapers published in Boston
1734 establishments in the Thirteen Colonies